Alfredo Hornedo y Suárez was a senator of the Liberal Party. Owner of the Mercado Único, the Mercado de Carlos III, the Casino Deportivo of Havana, and the news papers El Pais, Excelsior, El Sol, and El Crisol. He built the Teatro Blanquita, the Hotel Rosita Hornedo, and the Riomar Building. He owned various radio stations.

History

Alfredo Hornedo entered politics, elected by the Liberal Party, first in 1914, as councilman of the City of Havana, until he became a senator; elected 1938 and reelected in 1944 and 1948. He was also delegated to the Constitutional Assembly of 1940 and presided over the Liberal Party between 1939 and 1947. Alfredo Hornedo was an ingenious and lucid politician and businessman who, although he had a humble childhood selling oranges on the streets of Havana, began to work as a coachman for the Maruri family. The Maruri couple had a daughter, Blanquita, the young lady of the house, who fell in love with Hornedo and they ended up getting married. Although the social position and heritage of his in-laws favored him, Hornedo, with intelligence and skill, in a very short time, made the Maruri fortune grow, living together as a successful investor.

The historian of Havana, Eusebio Leal, remembers Hornedo dressed in gray, in a waistcoat. He was of medium height, and “the silver of his hair and the tan of his skin made him almost fascinating in the eyes of the child who was watching him. At his side, a servant or butler carried some very fine Carmelite dogs and extended a roll of paper with nickels that Alfredo Hornedo would soon distribute among the neighborhood children who at times sneaked into the patio of his mansion, located in Carlos III and Castillejo, to greet him and wait for the gift with which the millionaire rewarded them".

Leal continues: “Something strange evoked the humble past of that man. Another servant brought a small tray, on which, steaming, an ancient and polished güira gourd oscillated, with coffee, which he drank".

Business

In 1957, Hornedo built the Rosita De Hornedo building. He also owned the newspapers El País on Calle Galiano, moved to Calle Reina, the Excélsior newspaper, and the Mercado Único of La Habana, named the building after his second wife, Rosita Almanza; he built other properties in the area including the larger (201 apartments) Riomar Building, also by the architect Cristóbal Martínez Márquez and located in the adjoining lot. Alfredo Hornedo y Suárez was the owner of the Blanquita theater which opened in 1950, now the Karl Marx Theatre, and the Sports Casino, which is today the social circle Cristino Naranjo.

Gallery

See also

Rosita De Hornedo
Karl Marx Theatre
1940 Constitution of Cuba

Notes

References

External links
Inauguración del Teatro Blanquita
Alfredo Hornedo
Creó un IMPERIO y se lo quitaron TODO
Building Riomar

1882 births
1964 deaths
People from Havana
Cuban politicians
Cuban emigrants to the United States